James Waitaringa Mapu (4 March 1894–8 August 1985) was a New Zealand  interpreter, sportsman, farmer and community leader. Of Māori descent, he identified with the Ngati Kahungunu and Ngati Rakaipaaka iwi. He was born in Moteo, Hawke's Bay, New Zealand on 4 March 1894.

References

1894 births
1985 deaths
New Zealand farmers
New Zealand Māori sportspeople
Interpreters
Ngāti Kahungunu people
Ngati Rakaipaaka people
New Zealand Māori farmers
20th-century translators